Sanford Valley is a valley that trends north–south between Nottage Ridge and McClelland Ridge in the east part of Olympus Range, Victoria Land. Named by Advisory Committee on Antarctic Names (US-ACAN) (1997) after Leroy L. Sanford, topographic engineer, a member of the 1971-72 United States Geological Survey (USGS) field party that established a network of horizontal and vertical control for compilation of eight 1:50,000 scale maps of the area of McMurdo Dry Valleys bounded by 160° and 164° and 77°15' and 77°45'S.

Valleys of Victoria Land
McMurdo Dry Valleys